Ba'athism, also spelled Baathism, (from   , meaning "renaissance" or "resurrection") is an Arab nationalist ideology which promotes the creation and development of a unified Arab state through the leadership of a vanguard party over a socialist revolutionary government. The ideology is officially based on the theories of the Syrian intellectuals Michel Aflaq (per the Iraqi-led Ba'ath Party), Zaki al-Arsuzi (per the Syrian-led Ba'ath Party), and Salah al-Din al-Bitar. Baathist leaders of the modern era include the former leader of Iraq, Saddam Hussein, former President of Syria, Hafez Assad and his son, the current President of Syria, Bashar Assad.

The Ba'athist ideology advocates the "enlightenment of the Arabs" as well as the renaissance of their culture, values and society. It also advocates the creation of one-party states and rejects political pluralism in an unspecified length of time– the Ba'ath party theoretically uses an unspecified amount of time to develop an "enlightened" Arabic society. Ba'athism is based on the principles of Arab nationalism, pan-Arabism, and Arab socialism, as well as social progress. It is a secular ideology. A Ba'athist state supports socialist economics to varying degrees and it also supports public ownership of the commanding heights of the economy, but it opposes confiscatory policies with regard to private property. In Ba'athist ideology, socialism does not mean state-socialism or economic equality; rather, it has a strong current of modernization. Ba'athists contend that socialism is the only way to develop an Arab society which is free and united.

The two Ba'athist states which have existed (Iraq and Syria) prevented criticism of their ideology through authoritarian means of governance. Ba'athist Syria has been labelled "Neo-Ba'athist" rather than "Ba'athist" because the form of Ba'athism developed by the leadership of Syrian Ba'ath party was quite distinct from the Ba'athism which Aflaq and Bitar wrote about.

History

The origins of Baathism began with the political thought developed by Michel Aflaq, Salah al-Din al-Bitar, and Zaki Arsuzi. While Aflaq, Bitar and Arsuzi were never members of the same organization and formed different parties, with Aflaq and Bitar on one hand and Arsuzi on the other hand making different ideological contributions, they are considered the founders of Ba'athism. The closest they ever came to being members of the same organization was in 1939, when those three together with Michel Quzman, Shakir al-As and Ilyas Qandalaft, tried to establish a party. This did not happen because Arsuzi personally disliked Aflaq, who seemed to have reciprocated the feeling.

Arsuzi formed the Arab Ba'ath Party in 1940 and his views influenced Aflaq, who alongside junior partner Salah al-Din al-Bitar founded the Arab Ihya Movement in 1940 that later renamed itself the Arab Ba'ath Movement in 1943. Though Aflaq was influenced by him, Arsuzi initially did not cooperate with Aflaq's movement. Arsuzi suspected that the existence of the Arab Ihya Movement, which occasionally titled itself "Arab Ba'ath" during 1941, was part of an imperialist plot to prevent his influence over the Arabs by creating a movement of the same name.

Arsuzi was an Arab from Alexandretta who had been associated with Arab nationalist politics during the interwar period. He was inspired by the French Revolution, the German and Italian unification movements and the Japanese economic "miracle". His views were influenced by a number of prominent European philosophical and political figures, among them Georg Hegel, Karl Marx, Friedrich Nietzsche and Oswald Spengler.

When Arsuzi left the League of Nationalist Action (LNA) party in 1939 after its popular leader died and the party had fallen into disarray, he founded the short-lived Arab National Party in 1939 and dissolved it later that year. On 29 November 1940, Arsuzi founded the Arab Ba'ath. A significant conflict and turning point in the development of Ba'athism occurred when Arsuzi's and Aflaq's movements sparred over the issue of the 1941 coup d'etat by Rashid Ali Al-Gaylani and the subsequent Anglo-Iraqi War. Aflaq's movement supported Gaylani's government and the Iraqi government's war against the British and organized volunteers to go to Iraq and fight for the Iraqi government. However, Arsuzi opposed Gaylani's government, considering the coup to be poorly-planned and a failure. At this point, Arsuzi's party lost members and support that transferred to Aflaq's movement.

Subsequently, Arsuzi's direct influence in Arab politics collapsed after Vichy French authorities expelled him from Syria in 1941. Aflaq's Arab Ba'ath Movement's next major political action was its support of Lebanon's war of independence from France in 1943. The Arab Ba'ath Movement did not solidify for years until it held its first party congress in 1947, when it formally merged with Arsuzi's Arab Ba'ath Party. Although socialist values existed in the two Ba'ath movements from their inception, they weren't emphasized until the party merged with Akram Al-Hawrani's Arab Socialist Movement in 1953. Taking advantage of the chaotic years of the 1950s and 1960s, the Military Committe of Syrian Ba'ath party, led by its civilian leadership, launched a coup in 1963 that established a one-party state in Syria.

In 1966, the Military wing of the Syrian Ba'ath initiated another coup which overthrew its Old Guard led by Aflaq and Bitar, resulting in the schism within the Ba'athist movement: one Syrian-dominated and one Iraqi-dominated. Scholar Ofra Bengio claims that a consequence of the split was that Arsuzi took Aflaq's place as the official father of Ba'athist thought in the pro-Syrian Ba'ath movement while in the pro-Iraqi Ba'ath movement Aflaq was still considered the de jure father of Ba'athist thought. The Iraqi Ba'ath wing granted asylum to Aflaq after seizing power through the coup of 1968. Al-Assad family and Saddam Hussein emerged dominant in the Syrian and Iraqi Ba'ath parties respectively; eventually building personalist dictatorships in the two countries. Hostilities between the two Ba'ath movements lasted until the death of Hafez al-Assad in 2000, after which his successor Bashar al-Assad pursued reconciliation with Iraq.

Throughout its reign in power, the two Ba'athist autocracies built police states that enforced mass surveillance, ideological indoctrination and subordinated all student organisations, trade unions and other civil society institutions to the party and the state. Both regimes pursued Arabization of ethnic minorities and legitimized their authoritarian rule by implanting conspiratorial anti-Zionist, anti-Western sentiments upon the citizens. Saddam Hussein was toppled in 2003 during the United States invasion of Iraq and subsequently the Iraqi Ba'ath party was banned under the new De-Ba'athification policy. Syria descended into a deadly civil war following Bashar al-Assad's brutal crackdown of the 2011 Syrian revolution.

Definition
Aflaq is today considered the founder of the Baathist movement, or at least its most notable contributor. There were other notable ideologues as well, such as Arsuzi and Salah al-Din al-Bitar. From the founding of the Arab Baath Movement until the mid-1950s in Syria and the early 1960s in Iraq, the ideology of the Baath Party was largely synonymous with that of Aflaq's. Aflaq's view on Arab nationalism is considered by some, such as historian Paul Salem of the Middle East Institute, as romantic and poetic.

In intellectual terms, Aflaq recast the conservative Arab nationalist thoughts and changed them to reflect a strong revolutionary and progressive tendency which developed in harmony alongside the decolonisation and other events which happened in the Arab world at the time of his life. He insisted on the overthrow of the old ruling classes and supported the creation of a secular society by separating Islam from the state. Not all these ideas were his, but it was Aflaq who succeeded in turning these beliefs into a transnational movement. The core basis of Baathism is Arab socialism, a socialism with Arab characteristics which is not associated with the international socialist movement and pan-Arab ideology.

Baathism as developed by Aflaq and Bitar was a unique left-wing Arab-centric ideology. The ideology presented itself as representing the "Arab spirit against materialistic communism" and "Arab history against dead reaction". It held ideological similarity and a favourable outlook to the Non-Aligned Movement politics of Jawaharlal Nehru, Gamal Abdel Nasser and Josip Broz Tito and historically opposed affiliation with either the American-led Western Bloc or the Soviet-led Eastern Bloc during the Cold War.

Concepts

Arab nation

Aflaq supported Sati' al-Husri's view that language was the principal defining unifying factor of the Arab nation because language led to the unity of thought, norms and ideals. History was also another unifying feature, as it was the "fertile ground in which our consciousness took shape". The centre of Aflaq's Baathist thought was the feature bath (literally meaning "renaissance").

This renaissance could only be reached by uniting the Arab nation and it would transform the Arab world politically, economically, intellectually and morally. This "future renaissance" would be a "rebirth", while the first Arab renaissance had been the seventh-century emergence of Islam, according to Aflaq. The new "renaissance" would bring another Arab message, which was summed up in the Baath party's slogan "One Nation, Bearing an Eternal Message".

The Arab nation could only reach this "renaissance" through a revolutionary process towards the goals of "unity, liberty and socialism". In Aflaq's view, a nation could only "progress" or "decline". Arab states of his time could only progressively "decline" because of their illnesses – "feudalism, sectarianism, regionalism, intellectual reactionism". These problems, Aflaq believed, could only be resolved through a revolutionary process. A revolution could only succeed if the revolutionaries were pure and devoted nearly religiously to the task. Aflaq supported the Leninist view of the need of a vanguard party following a successful revolution, which was not an "inevitable outcome". In Baathist ideology, the vanguard was the Baath party.

Aflaq believed that the youth were the key for a successful revolution. The youth were open to change and enlightenment because they still had not been indoctrinated with other views. According to Aflaq, a major problem was the disillusionment of the Arab youth. Disillusionment led to individualism and individualism was not a healthy sign in an underdeveloped country, in contrast to developed countries, where it was a healthy sign.

The party's main task before the revolution was to spread enlightened ideas to the people and to challenge reactionary and conservative elements in society. According to Aflaq, a Baath party would ensure a policy of proselytization to keep the uneducated masses out of the party until the party leadership was enlightened with the thoughts of enlightenment. However, the party was also a political organisation, and, as Aflaq notes, politics was "a means [...] is the most serious of matters at this present stage". Baathism was similar to Leninist thought in that a vanguard party would rule for an unspecified length to construct a "new society".

Aflaq supported the idea of a committed activist revolutionary party based on the Leninist model, which in practice was based on democratic centralism. The revolutionary party would seize political power and from there on transform society for the greater good. While the revolutionary party was numerically a minority, it was an all-powerful institution which had the right to initiate a policy even if the majority of the population were against it. As with the Leninist model, the Baath party knew what was right and what was wrong since the population as a whole did not know this yet as they were still influenced by the old value and moral system.

Reactionary classes
According to Aflaq, the Arab Revolt (1916–1918) against the Ottoman Empire failed to unify the Arab world because it was led by a reactionary class. He believed the ruling class, who supported the monarchy as the leaders of the Arab Revolt did, were synonymous with a reactionary class. In Baathist ideology, the ruling class is replaced by a revolutionary progressive class. Aflaq was bitterly opposed to any kind of monarchy and described the Arab Revolt as "the illusions of kings and feudal lords who understood unity as the gathering of backwardness to backwardness, exploitation to exploitation and numbers to numbers like sheep".

It was the reactionary class's view of Arab unity which had left the Arab Revolt "struggling for unity without blood and nerve". Aflaq saw the German unification as proof of this. This view put Aflaq at odds with some Arab nationalists who were Germanophiles. According to Aflaq, Bismarck's unification of Germany established the most repressive nation the world had ever seen, a development which could largely be blamed on the existing monarchy and the reactionary class. According to Aflaq, to copy the German example would be disastrous and would lead to the enslavement of the Arab people.

The only way to combat the reactionary classes lay in "progressive" revolution, central to which is the struggle for unity. This struggle could not be separated from the social revolution – to separate these two would be the same as to weaken the movement. The reactionary classes, who are content with the status quo, would oppose the "progressive" revolution. Even if the revolution succeeded in one "region" (country), that region would be unable to develop because of the resource constraints, small populations and the anti-revolution forces held by other Arab leaders. For a revolution to succeed, the Arab world would have to evolve into an "organic whole" (literally become one). In short, Arab unity is both the cause of the "progressive" revolution and its effect.

A major obstacle to the success of the revolution is the Arab League. Aflaq believed that the Arab League strengthened both regional interests and the reactionary classes, thus weakening the chance of establishing an Arab nation. Because of the world situation where the majority of Arab states were under the rule of the reactionary classes, Aflaq revised his ideology to meet reality. Instead of creating an Arab nation through an Arab-wide progressive revolution, the main task would be of progressive revolutionaries spreading the revolution from one Arab country to the next. Once successfully transformed, the created progressive revolutionary countries would then one by one unite until the Arab world had evolved into a single Arab nation. The revolution would not succeed if the progressive revolutionary governments did not contribute to spreading the revolution.

Liberty

Fundamentally, Aflaq had an authoritarian perspective on liberty. In contrast to the liberal democratic concept of liberty, in Aflaq's vision liberty would be ensured by a Baath party which was not elected by the populace because the party had the common good at heart. Historian Paul Salem considered the weakness of such a system "quite obvious".

Aflaq saw liberty as one of the defining features of Baathism. Articulation of thoughts and the interaction between individuals were a way of building a new society. According to Aflaq, it was liberty which created new values and thoughts. Aflaq believed that living under imperialism, colonialism, religious or a non-enlightened dictatorship weakened liberty as ideas came from above, not from below through human interaction. One of the Baath party's main priorities according to Aflaq was to disseminate new ideas and thoughts and to give individuals the liberty they needed to pursue ideas as the party would interpose itself between the Arab people and both their foreign imperialist oppressors and those forms of tyranny that arise within Arab society.

While the notion of liberty was an important ideal to Aflaq, he favored the Leninist model of a continuous revolutionary struggle and he did not develop concepts for a society in which liberty was protected by a set of institutions and rules. His vision of a one-party state ruled by the Baath party, which disseminated information to the public, was in many ways contrary to his view on individual interactions. The Baath party through its preeminence would establish "liberty". According to Aflaq, liberty could not just come from nowhere as it needed an enlightened progressive group to create a truly free society.

Socialism

Socialism is an important pillar of Ba'athist programme. Although influenced by Western socialists and Marxist parties, Ba'ath party founders constructed a socialist vision which they believed to be more adaptable to Arab historical context. Articles 26-37 of the 1947 Ba'ath Party Charter outlines the key principles of Ba'athist socialism. Some of them are:

Michael Aflaq was a deep admirer of Marxist tenets and he considered the Marxist concept of the "importance of material economic conditions in life" to be one of modern humanity's greatest discoveries. However, he disagreed with the Marxist view that dialectical materialism was the only truth as Aflaq believed that Marxism had forgotten human spirituality. While believing that the concept would work for small and weak societies, the concept of dialectical materialism as the only truth in Arab development was wrong.

For a people as spiritual as the Arabs, the working class was just a group, albeit the most important group, in a much larger movement to free the Arab nation. Unlike Karl Marx, Aflaq was uncertain what place the working class had in history. In contrast to Marx, Aflaq also believed in nationalism and believed that in the Arab world all classes and not just the working class were working against "capitalist domination of the foreign powers". What was a struggle between various classes in the West was in the Arab world a fight for political and economic independence.

For Aflaq, socialism was a necessary means to accomplish the goal of initiating an Arabic "renaissance" period, in other words a period of modernisation. While unity brought the Arab world together and liberty provided the Arab people with freedom, socialism was the cornerstone which made unity and liberty possible as no socialism meant no revolution. In Aflaq's view, a constitutional democratic system would not succeed in a country such as Syria that was dominated by a "pseudo-feudalist" economic system in which the repression of the peasant nullified the people's political liberty. Liberty meant little to nothing to the general poverty-stricken populace of Syria and Aflaq saw socialism as the solution to their plight.

According to Aflaq, the ultimate goal of socialism was not to answer the question of how much state control was necessary or economic equality, but instead socialism was "a means to satisfy the animal needs of man so he can be free to pursue his duties as a human being". In other words, socialism was a system which freed the population from enslavement and created independent individuals. However, economic equality was a major tenet in Baathist ideology as the elimination of inequality would "eliminate all privilege, exploitation, and domination by one group over another". In short, if liberty was to succeed, the Arab people needed socialism.

Aflaq labeled this form of socialism Arab socialism to signify that it existed in harmony with and was in some ways subordinate to Arab nationalism. According to Aflaq, who was a Christian, the teaching and reforms of Muhammad had given socialism an authentic Arab expression. Socialism was viewed by Aflaq as justice and the reforms of Muhammad were both just and wise. According to Aflaq, modern Baathists would initiate another way of just and radical forms just as Muhammad had done in the seventh century.

Role of Islam

Though a Christian, Aflaq viewed the creation of Islam as proof of "Arab genius" and a testament of Arab culture, values and thought. According to Aflaq, the essence of Islam was its revolutionary qualities. Aflaq called on all Arabs, both Muslims and non-Muslims alike, to admire the role Islam had played in creating an Arab character, but his view on Islam was purely spiritual and Aflaq emphasized that it "should not be imposed" on state and society. Time and again Aflaq emphasized that the Baath party was against atheism, but also against fundamentalism as the fundamentalists represented a "shallow, false faith".

According to Baathist ideology, all religions were equal. Despite his anti-atheist stance, Aflaq was a strong supporter of secular government and stated a Baathist state would replace religion with a state "based on a foundation, Arab nationalism, and a moral; freedom". During the Shia riots against the Iraqi Baath government in the late-1970s, Aflaq warned Saddam Hussein of making any concessions to the rioters, exclaiming that the Baath Party "is with [religious] faith, but is not a religious party, nor should it be one". During his vice presidency, at the time of the Shia riots Saddam discussed the need to convince large segments of the population to convert to the party line's stance on religion.

When Aflaq died in 1989, an official announcement by the Iraqi Regional Command stated that Aflaq had converted to Islam before his death, but an unnamed Western diplomat in Iraq told William Harris that Aflaq's family was not aware that he had undergone any religious conversion. Prior, during and after the Gulf War, the government became progressively more Islamic and by the beginning of the 1990s Saddam proclaimed the Baath party to be the party "of Arabism and Islam".

Neo-Ba'athism

Abraham Ben-Tzur labeled the Ba'ath Party which took power in the 8th of March Revolution in Syria and had taken power in Iraq as the "Neo-Ba'ath" for the reason that the Ba'ath Party had gone beyond their pan-Arab ideological basis and stressed preeminence of the military apparatus. The key party document Some Theoretical Propositions states that "[s]ocialism is the true goal of Arab unity... Arab unity is the obligatory basis for constructing a socialist society". In short, pan-Arabism became the means to reach the end of both economic and social transformation. John F. Devlin agrees on the matter and states that the "Ba'ath Party, which started with unity as its overwhelming top priority, which was prepared to work within a variety of Middle Eastern political systems, which wanted social justice in society, had pretty much disappeared by the early 1960s. In its place rose Baath organisations which focused primarily on their own region, which advocated, and created where possible, authoritarian centralised governments, which rested heavily on military power and which were very close to other socialist movements and were less distinctively Ba'athist". Munif al-Razzaz, the former Secretary General of the National Command of the unitary Ba'ath Party, agreed with the theory and stated that from 1961 onwards there existed two Ba'ath parties: "the military Ba'ath Party and the Ba'ath Party, and real power lay with the former". He further stated that the military Ba'ath (as paraphrased by Martin Seymour) "was and remains Ba'athist only in name; that it was and remains little more than a military clique with civilian hangers-on; and that from the initial founding of the Military Committee by disgruntled Syrian officers exiled in Cairo in 1959, the chain of events and the total corruption of Ba'athism proceeded with intolerable logic". Salah al-Din al-Bitar agreed, stating that the 1966 Syrian coup d'état "marked the end of Ba'athist politics in Syria". Aflaq shared the sentiment by stating: "I no longer recognise my party!".

Salah Jadid's government abandoned the traditional goal of pan-Arab unity and replaced it with a radical form of Western socialism. The far-left shift was reflected strongly in the ideological propaganda of the new government; marked by widespread usage of terminology such as "people's war" (itself a Maoist term, as the Six-Day War was proclaimed as a "people's war" against Israel) and "class struggle". The Syrian Communist Party played an important role in Jadid's government as some communists held ministerial posts and Jadid established "fairly close relations" with the Communist Party of the Soviet Union. The government supported a more radical economic program, state ownership over industry and foreign trade while at the same time trying to restructure agrarian relations and production. In 1968, Al-Bitar left the Baath movement, claiming that "these parties had ceased to be what they set up to be, retaining only their names and acting as the organs of power and the instruments of regional and dictatorial governments". Contrary to expectations, Aflaq remained with the Ba'ath movement and became the ideologue of the Iraqi-dominated Ba'ath movement. His ideological views remained more or less the same, but in Iraq he was sidelined politically.

Assadism
Since 1970, when Hafez al-Assad took power, Syria has been under the control of the Assad family. Assad's government was a personal government, meaning a government that is based upon and revolves around the leader and the term “Assadism” was coined to explain how Assad's leadership dominates Syrian politics. The authorities have tried to portray the wisdom of Assad as "beyond the comprehension of the average citizen". Assadism and the neo-Ba'athist government which currently runs Syria are both based upon nepotism and ethnic favoritism – it was Assad who began the Alawitization of the party and the military; and who also began building a government based on loyalty to the leader's family. Jamal al-Atassi, a former co-founder of Zaki al-Arsuzi's Arab Ba'ath Party and later Syrian dissident, stated that "Assadism is a false nationalism. It's the domination of a minority, and I'm not talking just of the Alawites, who control the society's nervous system. I include also the army and the mukhabarat. [...] And despite its socialist slogans, the state is run by a class who has made a fortune without contributing–a nouvelle bourgeoisie parasitaire". Despite this, Assadism is not an ideology – it is a cult of personality, but it is the closest thing Syria comes to an all-encompassing belief system since both Ba'athist and Arab nationalist beliefs have been watered down to such an extent as to not hurt the government's populist credentials.

Iraqi Ba'athism

Saddamism 

Saddamism (Saddamiya) is a political ideology based on the politics related to and pursued by Saddam Hussein. It has also been referred to by Iraqi politicians as Saddamist Ba'athism (Al-Bathiya Al-Saddamiyya). It is officially described as a distinct variation of Baathism. It espouses Iraqi nationalism and an Iraq-centred Arab world that calls upon Arab countries to adopt Saddamist Iraqi political discourse and to reject "the Nasserite discourse" that it claims collapsed after 1967. It is militarist and views political disputes and conflicts in a military manner as "battles" requiring: "fighting", "mobilization", "battlefields", "bastions" and "trenches". Saddamism was officially supported by Saddam's government and promoted by the Iraqi daily newspaper Babil owned by Saddam's son Uday Hussein.

Saddam and his ideologists sought to fuse a connection between ancient Babylonian and Assyrian civilization in Iraq with Arab nationalism by claiming that the ancient Babylonians and Assyrians are the ancestors of the Arabs. Thus Saddam and his supporters claimed that there is no conflict between Mesopotamian heritage and Arab nationalism.

Saddam's government was critical of Marxism and opposed the orthodox Marxist concepts of class conflict, dictatorship of the proletariat and state atheism as well as opposing Marxism–Leninism's claim that non-Marxist–Leninist parties are automatically bourgeois in nature – claiming that the Ba'ath Party is a popular revolutionary movement and that as such the people rejected petit bourgeois politics. Saddam claimed that the Arab nation did not have the class structure which existed in other nations and that class divisions were more along national lines between Arabs and non-Arabs rather than within the Arab community. However, he spoke fondly of Vladimir Lenin and commended Lenin for giving Russian socialism a uniquely Russian specificity that Marx alone was incapable of doing. He also expressed admiration for other communist leaders such as Fidel Castro, Hồ Chí Minh and Josip Broz Tito due to their spirit of asserting national independence rather than their communism.

Controversy

Allegations of fascism
Cyprian Blamires claims that "Ba'athism may have been a Middle Eastern variant of fascism, even though Aflaq and other Ba'athist leaders criticized particular fascist ideas and practices". According to him, the Ba'ath movement shared several characteristics with the European fascist movements such as "the attempt to synthesize radical, illiberal nationalism and non-Marxist socialism, a romantic, mythopoetic, and elitist 'revolutionary' vision, the desire to create a 'new man' and restore past greatness, a centralised authoritarian party divided into 'right-wing' and 'left-wing' factions and so forth; several close associates later admitted that Aflaq had been directly inspired by certain fascist and Nazi theorists". An argument against Aflaq's fascist credentials is based on the fact that he was an active member of the Syrian–Lebanese Communist Party, he participated in the activities of the French Communist Party during his stay in France and that he was influenced by some of the ideas of Karl Marx.

According to Sami Jundi, one of the co-founders of the Arab Baath Party which was established by Zaki Arsuzi, the party's emblem was the tiger because it would "excite the imagination of the youth, in the tradition of Nazism and Fascism, but taking into consideration the fact that the Arab is in his nature distant from pagan symbols [like the swastika]". Arsuzi's Baath Party believed in the virtues of "one leader" and Arsuzi himself personally believed in the racial superiority of the Arabs. The party's members read a lot of Nazi literature, such as The Foundations of the Nineteenth Century; they were one of the first groups to plan the translation of Mein Kampf into Arabic; and they also actively searched for a copy of The Myth of the Twentieth Century – according to Moshe Ma'oz, the only copy of it was in Damascus and it was owned by Aflaq. Arsuzi did not support the Axis powers and refused Italy's advances for party-to-party relations, but he was also influenced by the racial theories of Houston Stewart Chamberlain. Arsuzi claimed that historically Islam and Muhammad had reinforced the nobility and purity of the Arabs, which had both degenerated because Islam had been adopted by other peoples. He had been associated with the League of Nationalist Action, a political party which existed in Syria from 1932 to 1939 and was strongly influenced by fascism and Nazism as evidenced by its paramilitary "Ironshirts."

According to a British journalist who interviewed Barzan Ibrahim Tikriti, the head of the Iraqi intelligence services, Saddam Hussein drew inspiration on how to rule Iraq from Joseph Stalin and Adolf Hitler and he had once asked Barzan to procure copies of their works, not for racist or antisemitic purposes, but "as an example of the successful organisation of an entire society by the state for the achievement of national goals."

Allegations of racism
The National Vanguard Party, which has ties to the Iraqi Baath party, was accused of being racist by the Mauritanian government and certain political groups.

The Iraqi Regional Branch could either approve or disapprove of marriages between party members and in a party document, party branches were ordered "to thoroughly check the Arabic origin of not only the prospective wife but also her family, and no approval should be given to members who plan to marry [someone] of non-Arab origin." During the war with Iran, the party began to confront members who were of non-Arab, especially Iranian origin. One memo which was directly sent from the party Secretariat to Saddam read that "the party suffers from the existence of members who are not originally Arabs as this might constitute a danger to the party in the future". The Secretariat recommended that people who were of Iranian origin should not be allowed to become party members. In his reply to the document, Saddam wrote: "1) [I] Agree with the opinion of the Party Secretariat; 2) To be discussed in the [Regional] Command meeting". All of those who were denied membership, and all of those whose memberships were revoked, were loyal Baathists. For instance, one Baathist of Iranian origin whose membership was revoked had been a member of the party since 1958, had also participated in the Ramadan Revolution and had even been imprisoned by the authorities in the aftermath of the November 1963 Iraqi coup d'état because he supported the Baathist cause. Later, the authorities began to specifically look for people of Iraqi origin and any contact which they had with Iran and/or Iranians functioned as a good enough reason to deny them party membership.

References

Works cited

External links
The Constitution of the Arab Socialist Baath Party

 
Political ideologies
Arab socialism
Arab nationalism
Left-wing nationalism
Syncretic political movements
Types of socialism